Moholt is a neighborhood in the city of Trondheim in Trøndelag county, Norway.  It is situated the borough of Lerkendal.  It is south of Tyholt and north of Loholt. The area is dominated by housing, including a lot of student housing. There are also some supermarkets and commercial enterprises in the area, primarily because of the proximity to the European route E06 highway. Also located at Moholt is the Trondheim Business School, a faculty of Sør-Trøndelag University College.

References

External links

Student housing office
Moholt student village info page

Geography of Trondheim
Neighbourhoods of Trondheim